Tal-e Chega (also Romanized as Tal-e Chegā; also known as Tal-e Chegāh, Tolchegāh, Tal Chekā and Tal Cheqā) is a village in Kuh Mareh Khami Rural District, in the Central District of Basht County, Kohgiluyeh and Boyer-Ahmad Province, Iran. At the 2006 census, its population was 139, in 35 families.

References 

Populated places in Basht County